North Dakota Highway 13 (ND 13) is an approximately  highway that serves southeast North Dakota. Its eastern terminus is at the Minnesota state line over the Bois de Sioux River.

Route description
North Dakota Highway 13 has its western terminus in Emmons County with ND 1804 and travels east about thirteen miles before entering Linton and beginning a concurrency with US 83. About five miles east of the county line, ND 13 starts a concurrency with ND 3. This concurrency travels about ten miles east to Wishek, where the highways part and ND 3 heads south. ND 13 then travels about eleven miles northeast to Lehr. In Lehr, the highway serves as the southern terminus of ND 30. A short distance northeast of Lehr, ND 13 travels along the McIntosh-Logan county line for about nine miles before curving northeast and into Logan County.

Northeast of here is the start of a concurrency with ND 56. The concurrency heads three miles east and enters LaMoure County. Still concurrent, ND 13 and ND 56 travel four miles east before ND 56 heads south to Kulm and ND 13 heads north and east to the city of Edgeley. In Edgeley, ND 13 intersects US 281. After this intersection, the highway heads eighteen miles due east to LaMoure. After traveling six miles east, the highway curves to the east-northeast for about five miles to parallel nearby railroad tracks. The highway reaches Verona and begins a concurrency with ND 1. The concurrency heads due south for six miles before heading west along the LaMoure-Dickey county line for about half of a mile. After this, the highways curve south once more and enter Dickey County. ND 13's concurrency with ND 1 continues southward for four miles, then ND 1 continues to head south toward Oakes, while ND 13 forks to the east and travels to Gwinner, entering Sargent County in the process. Just east of Gwinner, ND 13 is concurrent with ND 32 for a mile east. ND 13 travels eight miles east of this concurrency, then a mile north and about a mile and a half northeast to reach the southeast corner of Milnor. ND 13 then travels east to the Richland county line.

About six miles east of the county line, ND 13 intersects ND 18 in Wyndmere. A few miles east of Wyndmere is the small community of Barney. East of Barney is the city of Mooreton and east of Mooreton, ND 13 intersects Interstate 29 and US 81. Through Wahpeton, the road is also known as Dakota Avenue. The highway's eastern terminus is over the Bois de Sioux River, on the state line with Minnesota.

Major intersections

Gallery

References

External links
The North Dakota Highways Page by Chris Geelhart
North Dakota Signs by Mark O'Neil

013
Transportation in Emmons County, North Dakota
Transportation in McIntosh County, North Dakota
Transportation in Logan County, North Dakota
Transportation in LaMoure County, North Dakota
Transportation in Dickey County, North Dakota
Transportation in Sargent County, North Dakota
Transportation in Richland County, North Dakota